Ivanka Brađašević is a contemporary Croatian poet, writer and librarian.

Brađašević was born in 1955 in Nova Kapela near Slavonski Brod. She graduated Croatian language, Croatian literature and librarianship at the Faculty of Philosophy in Zagreb. She worked as a professor and librarian both in Labin and Zagreb. She collaborated with Stjepan Lice, Sonja Tomić, Željka Horvat-Vukelja and other prominent Croatian writers of Catholic orientation.

Her works were published in Zagorski list, Zvonik, Križ života, Kapelanija MUP-a, as well as by the Press agency of the Episcopal Conference of Bosnia and Herzegovina, "Katolici na internetu" and many other Catholic media. Brađašević was awarded several times by the Ministry of Tourism and Brod-Posavina County for her work. She contributed to both the Sida Košutić Days, literary manifestation in Radoboj and Poetry meetings of Stjepan Kranjčić in Križevci.

References 

1955 births
20th-century Croatian women writers
Croatian women poets
Croatian librarians
Women librarians
20th-century Croatian poets
21st-century Croatian poets
21st-century Croatian women writers
Living people
People from Slavonski Brod
Faculty of Humanities and Social Sciences, University of Zagreb alumni